Cypress Gardens is a census-designated place (CDP) in Polk County, Florida, United States. The population was 10,169 at the 2020 census. It is part of the Lakeland–Winter Haven Metropolitan Statistical Area.

Geography
Cypress Gardens is located at  (28.003443, -81.690492).

Demographics

At the 2000 census there were 8,844 people, 3,584 households, and 2,630 families in the CDP. The racial makeup of the CDP was 94.09% White, 1.92% African American, 0.28% Native American, 1.68% Asian, 0.86% from other races, and 1.16% from two or more races. Hispanic or Latino of any race were 3.10%.

Of the 3,584 households 27.3% had children under the age of 18 living with them, 63.2% were married couples living together, 8.0% had a female householder with no husband present, and 26.6% were non-families. 23.1% of households were one person and 12.6% were one person aged 65 or older.  The average household size was 2.42 and the average family size was 2.84.

The age distribution was 21.5% under the age of 18, 5.0% from 18 to 24, 23.4% from 25 to 44, 26.8% from 45 to 64, and 23.4% 65 or older.  The median age was 45 years. For every 100 females, there were 87.9 males.  For every 100 females age 18 and over, there were 83.1 males.

The median household income was $49,778 and the median family income  was $57,387. Males had a median income of $39,286 versus $26,595 for females. The per capita income for the CDP was $25,366.  About 2.4% of families and 3.2% of the population were below the poverty line, including 3.6% of those under age 18 and 4.2% of those age 65 or over.

References

Census-designated places in Polk County, Florida
Census-designated places in Florida